Live: In the Red is a live performance album by American noise rock band Pussy Galore, released on February 16, 1998 by In the Red Recordings.

Track listing

Personnel
Adapted from the Live: In the Red liner notes.

Pussy Galore
 Bob Bert – drums
 Neil Hagerty – electric guitar, vocals
 Jon Spencer – lead vocals, electric guitar, mixing
 Kurt Wolf – electric guitar

Production and additional personnel
 Peter Arsenault – recording
 Michael Lavine – photography
 Pussy Galore – production
 Greg Talenfeld – mixing

Release history

References

External links 
 

1998 live albums
Pussy Galore (band) albums